Osmanbey is an underground rapid transit station on the M2 line of the Istanbul Metro. It is located in south-central Şişli under Halaskargazi Avenue. Osmanbey was opened on 16 September 2000 and is one of the six original stations on the M2 line. It has an island platform serviced by two tracks.

Layout

References

Railway stations opened in 2000
Istanbul metro stations
Şişli
2000 establishments in Turkey